Francis Ross (born 18 February 1998) is a Scottish professional footballer who plays as a winger for USL League One club One Knoxville SC. He has previously played for Aberdeen, Greenock Morton, Ayr United and Go Ahead Eagles.

Career
On 16 May 2015, Ross made his professional debut for Aberdeen in a league match against Dundee. On 3 July 2016, he signed a new two-year contract. On 3 December 2017, Ross scored his first senior goal for the Dons from a free-kick against Rangers. On 8 December, in the next match, he was given his first start for the club, in a 1–0 win against Dundee.

Ross was loaned to Championship club Greenock Morton in January 2018. On 8 July 2019, Ross moved on loan to Ayr United until January.

He signed a new one-year deal in May 2019 with the Dons, with the option of a further year. However on 12 June 2020, Ross was released by Aberdeen.

On 20 August 2020, Ross signed for Dutch club Go Ahead Eagles, on a two-year contract with the option of a third.

In January 2021, he tore a cruciate ligament in the cup match against VVV Venlo.

Ross signed with One Knoxville SC on 14 December 2022, ahead of their inaugural season in USL League One, the American third division.

Personal life
Ross is from Ellon and joined Aberdeen when he was eight years old.

His older sister Natalie Ross has played for the Scotland women's national football team and clubs including Arsenal and Celtic.

Career statistics

References

1998 births
Living people
Scottish footballers
Association football midfielders
Aberdeen F.C. players
Greenock Morton F.C. players
Ayr United F.C. players
Go Ahead Eagles players
Scottish Professional Football League players
Eerste Divisie players
Scotland youth international footballers
Footballers from Aberdeenshire
People from Ellon, Aberdeenshire
Scottish expatriate footballers
Expatriate footballers in the Netherlands
Scottish expatriate sportspeople in the Netherlands
Scottish expatriate sportspeople in the United States
Expatriate soccer players in the United States
One Knoxville SC players